Pottery Barn is an American upscale home furnishing store chain and e-commerce company, with retail stores in the United States, Canada, Mexico and Australia. Pottery Barn is a wholly owned subsidiary of Williams-Sonoma, Inc.

The company is headquartered in San Francisco, California. Pottery Barn also operates several specialty stores such as Pottery Barn Kids and Pottery Barn Teen. It has three retail catalogues: the traditional Pottery Barn catalogue; Pottery Barn Bed + Bath to focus on its bed and bath lines; and one for outdoor furniture.

Early history
The Pottery Barn was co-founded in 1949 by Paul Secon and his brother Morris in West Chelsea, Manhattan. Paul discovered three barns full of pottery from the factory of Glidden Parker in Alfred, New York, who had stored extras and seconds up the road from the business. The Secon brothers built their chain up to seven stores. Paul sold his share in 1966 and Morris sold his to a pair of outside partners in 1968. The new owner expanded the chain to 13 stores before selling it to The Gap in 1984.

The company was acquired by Williams-Sonoma, Inc. in 1986. Growth continued until the Great Recession. Its mail-order catalog was first published in 1987. In 1999, the company introduced Pottery Barn Kids as a premium children's home furnishing and accessories brand. By 2000, the company had launched an e-commerce site for quick ordering process.

Pottery Barn Teen, the first home retailer to focus on teenagers, was launched in 2003. The first Pottery Barn Teen store opened in Georgia in 2009, as well as in New York City and Chicago. The store has a sub-brand Pottery Barn Dorm for young people starting college life.

Later history

In 2017, the company introduced an augmented reality app for iOS that allowed users to virtually place Pottery Barn products into a room and save room design ideas. It also announced PB Apartment, a small-space furnishings line, for millennials.

In 2018, Pottery Barn Kids partnered with John Lewis which marked the first appearance of the brand in the United Kingdom. Its shop-in-shops featured furniture and accessories for nurseries. Ireland became the first European country to hold the franchise for Pottery Barn Kids in 2019. Pottery Barn Teens partnered with Aquafil on the Spring 2020 collection "Watercolor Dots" rug, which uses regenerated nylon made from waste gathered in the ocean and other bodies of water.

In popular culture
Pottery Barn is referenced a number of times in Friends. For instance, when Rachel buys furniture for Phoebe's apartment (which she is staying in at the time), and claims it's all authentically old furniture, rather than being from Pottery Barn. Another example is in Seinfeld, Kramer talks with Jerry about how he is receiving too many catalogs from Pottery Barn. He saves the collected catalogs, takes them, and throws them into the store. Sheldon Cooper references it often in The Big Bang Theory. A Pottery Barn retail store is seen situated next to Felix Unger's Manhattan F.U. Enterprises office/studio in The Odd Couple's first season in 1970. Pottery Barn is referenced in the Broadway musical Dear Evan Hansen, as a location where the title character works. He informs another character that he can get her and her family a discount in "overpriced home décor." In the season 3 episode of the American family sitcom Boy Meets World titled "What I Meant to Say", Corey Matthews confesses to his girlfriend, Topanga Lawrence, that he loves her. Eric Matthews, Corey's older brother, then under social pressure, tells his girlfriend, Christie, that he loves her as well. This leads Christie to take Eric on a trip to Pottery Barn, which Eric laments. While at Pottery Barn, Eric and Christie buy a ceramic cat and napkin holders.

The brand's "Found" collection sells vintage items from around the world. The company has partnered on collections with a number of pop cultural brands such as Harry Potter, Star Wars, Frozen, Thomas & Friends, Fantastic Beasts, and Friends.

References

Retail companies established in 1949
Home decor retailers
Furniture retailers of the United States
Retail companies based in California
Companies based in San Francisco
Williams-Sonoma
American companies established in 1949
1949 establishments in New York City
1986 mergers and acquisitions